Rogersonanthus is a genus of flowering plants belonging to the family Gentianaceae.

Its native range is Guyana, Trinidad and Tobago and Venezuela in northern South America.

The genus name of Rogersonanthus is in honour of Clark Thomas Rogerson (1918–2001), an American mycologist. 
It was first described and published in Mem. New York Bot. Gard. Vol.51 on page 3 in 1989.

Known species, according to Kew:
Rogersonanthus arboreus 
Rogersonanthus quelchii

References

Gentianaceae
Gentianaceae genera
Plants described in 1989
Flora of Guyana
Flora of Trinidad and Tobago
Flora of Venezuela